Abel Yalew Tilahun (born 23 March 1996) is an Ethiopian professional footballer who plays as a forward for Ethiopian Premier League club Saint George and the Ethiopia national team.

International career
Talew made his international debut with the Ethiopia national team in a 3–0 win over South Sudan in the 2017 CECAFA Cup on 5 December 2017.

References

External links
 
 

1995 births
Living people
Sportspeople from Addis Ababa
Ethiopian footballers
Ethiopia international footballers
Ethiopian Premier League players
Association football forwards